The 31st European Championships in Women's Artistic Gymnastics Seniors and Juniors was held from 1 to 5 June 2016, at the PostFinance-Arena in Bern, Switzerland. It was the first time the city had hosted a major female international competition (it hosted the 1975 Men's European Gymnastics Championships), and was the first time Switzerland hosted the competition in the country.

Venue 

The competition was held at the PostFinance-Arena. Formerly the Bern Arena, it houses the home games of National League A ice hockey team SC Bern. Built in 1967, the arena has a capacity of just over 17,000 spectators – this makes it one of the largest arenas to host the competition.

Schedule

Television broadcasters 
 Europe – UEG
  Switzerland – SRG SSR
  United Kingdom – BBC

Medal summary

Medalists

Medal table

Combined

Seniors

Juniors

Results

Seniors

Team

Vault

Uneven bars

Balance beam

Floor

Qualification

Team

Vault

Uneven bars

Balance beam

Floor

Juniors

Team

All-around

Vault

Uneven bars

Balance beam

Floor

Qualification

All-around

Vault

Uneven bars

Balance beam

Floor

References

External links
 

European Artistic Gymnastics Championships
European Women's Artistic Gymnastics Championships
Gymnastics
2016 in Swiss women's sport
International gymnastics competitions hosted by Switzerland